The men's marathon at the 1938 European Athletics Championships was held in Paris, France, on 4 September 1938.

Medalists

Results

Final
4 September

Participation
According to an unofficial count, 15 athletes from 9 countries participated in the event.

 (2)
 (1)
 (2)
 (2)
 (1)
 (2)
 (1)
 (2)
 (2)

References

Marathon
Marathons at the European Athletics Championships
Marathons in France
Men's marathons